The 1978 UC Davis football team represented the University of California, Davis as a member of the Far Western Conference (FWC) during the 1978 NCAA Division II football season. Led by ninth-year head coach Jim Sochor, UC Davis compiled an overall record of 8–3 with a mark of 5–0, winning the FWC for the eighth consecutive season. 1978 was the team's ninth consecutive winning season. With the 5–0 conference record, they stretched their conference winning streak to 28 games dating back to the 1973 season. The Aggies advanced to the NCAA Division II Football Championship playoffs for the second consecutive season, where they lost to eventual national champion Eastern Illinois in the first round. The team outscored its opponents 304 to 156 for the season. The Aggies played home games at Toomey Field in Davis, California.

Schedule

NFL Draft
The following UC Davis Aggies players were selected in the 1979 NFL Draft.

References

UC Davis
UC Davis Aggies football seasons
Northern California Athletic Conference football champion seasons
UC Davis Aggies football